GNU Screen is a terminal multiplexer, a software application that can be used to multiplex several virtual consoles, allowing a user to access multiple separate login sessions inside a single terminal window, or detach and reattach sessions from a terminal. It is useful for dealing with multiple programs from a command line interface, and for separating programs from the session of the Unix shell that started the program, particularly so a remote process continues running even when the user is disconnected.

Released under the terms of version 3 or later of the GNU General Public License, GNU Screen is free software.

Features

GNU Screen can be thought of as a text version of graphical window managers, or as a way of putting virtual terminals into any login session. It is a wrapper that allows multiple text programs to run at the same time, and provides features that allow the user to use the programs within a single interface productively. This enables the following features: persistence, multiple windows, and session sharing.

Screen is often used when a network connection to the terminal is unreliable, as a dropped network connection typically terminates all programs the user was running (child processes of the login session), due to the session ending and sending a "hangup" signal (SIGHUP) to all the child processes. Running the applications under screen means that the session does not terminate – only the now-defunct terminal gets detached – so applications don't even know the terminal has detached, and allows the user to reattach the session later and continue working from where they left off.

History
Screen was originally designed by Oliver Laumann and Carsten Bormann at the Technical University of Berlin and published in 1987.

Design criteria included VT100 emulation (including ANSI X3.64 (ISO 6429) and ISO 2022) and reasonable performance for heavy daily use when character-based terminals were still common. Later, the at-the-time novel feature of disconnection/reattachment was added.

Around 1990, Laumann handed over maintenance of the code to Jürgen Weigert and Michael Schroeder at the University of Erlangen–Nuremberg, who later moved the project to the GNU Project and added features such as scrollback, split-screen, copy-and-paste, and screen sharing.

By 2014, development had slowed to a crawl. Wanting to change this, Amadeusz Sławiński volunteered to help. In response, Laumann granted him maintainership. Sławiński proceeded to put out the first new Screen release in half a decade. Because there were some unofficial "Screen 4.1" releases floating around the Internet, he called this new release "Screen 4.2.0".

In May 2015, on openSUSE Conference, Jürgen Weigert invited Alexander Naumov to help to develop and maintain GNU screen. Two months later with Alex's help GNU screen 4.3.0 was released.

See also

 xpra, a tool to run X Window System applications on one machine, disconnect them from that machine's display, then reconnect them to another machine's display.
 Byobu, a frontend for GNU Screen or tmux
 tmux, an ISC-licensed terminal multiplexer with a feature set similar to GNU Screen

Further reading
 Jeff Covey (12 Oct 2002) The Antidesktop, Freshmeat

References

 Martin Streicher (10 Feb 2009) Speaking UNIX: Stayin' alive with Screen, IBM DeveloperWorks
 Philip J. Hollenback (22 Aug 2006) Using screen for remote interaction, Linux.com
 Adam Lazur (January 2003) Power Sessions with Screen, Linux Journal, issue 105
 William Von Hagen, Brian K. Jones, Linux server hacks, Volume 2, O'Reilly Media, 2005, pp. 155–157 (Hack #34)
 Carl Albing, J. P. Vossen, Cameron Newham, Bash cookbook, O'Reilly Media, 2007, pp. 415–418
 Dru Lavigne, BSD hacks, O'Reilly Media, 2004, pp. 44–48 (Hack #12)
 Noah Gift, Jeremy Jones, Python for Unix and Linux system administration, O'Reilly Germany, 2008, pp. 300–301
 Paul Mutton, IRC hacks, O'Reilly Media, 2004, pp. 345–349 (Hack #92)

Notes

External links
 
 Quick reference
 Source code repository

1987 software
Screen
Termcap
Terminal multiplexers
Unix software